Clarkson University is a private research university with its main campus in Potsdam, New York, and additional graduate program and research facilities in the New York Capital Region and Beacon, New York. It was founded in 1896 and has an enrollment of about 4,300 students studying toward bachelor's, master's, and doctoral degrees in each of its schools or institutes: the Institute for a Sustainable Environment, the School of Arts & Sciences, the David D. Reh School of Business, the Wallace H. Coulter School of Engineering, and the Earl R. and Barbara D. Lewis School of Health Sciences. It is classified among "R2: Doctoral Universities – High research activity."

History
The school was founded in 1896, funded by the sisters of Thomas S. Clarkson, a local entrepreneur who was accidentally killed while working in his sandstone quarry not far from Potsdam. When a worker was in danger of being crushed by a loose pump, Clarkson pushed him out of the way risking his own life. Clarkson was crushed against a wall by the swinging pump, sustaining severe internal injuries. He died five days later. The Clarkson family realized great wealth in the development of such quarries, and Potsdam sandstone was highly sought after by developers of townhouses in New York City and elsewhere. The family were important benefactors in the Potsdam area. The school was called the Thomas S. Clarkson Memorial School of Technology.

In 1913, the name was changed to Thomas S. Clarkson Memorial College of Technology, which was used in a shortened version as Clarkson College of Technology or CCT. During the first half of the 20th century the majority of the campus was located "downtown". The campus slowly expanded to an area known as the "Hill", located on the south-western edge of the village. As of 2001, almost all academics and housing had moved to the hill campus, although the university still uses the downtown buildings known as Old Snell and Old Main for administrative functions. In 2022, the  Clarkson board of trustees named the hill campus "The Collins Hill Campus" in honor of longtime President Tony Collins.  

On February 24, 1984, the school officially became Clarkson University, although the pep band's rallying cry at hockey games is still "Let's Go Tech!". The school and its hockey team have carried the nickname "Tech" since the 1896 founding. "CCT" is still printed on older school property and equipment.

On Feb. 1, 2016, Union Graduate College merged into Clarkson University and became the Clarkson University Capital Region Campus in Schenectady, New York.

Academics
More than 50 undergraduate majors and minors are available at the university. The university also offers master's and doctoral degrees. These degree programs are offered through the School of Arts & Sciences, David D. Reh School of Business, Institute for a Sustainable Environment, Wallace H. Coulter School of Engineering, the Earl R. and Barbara D. Lewis School of Health Sciences and the Clarkson School.

Clarkson University is home to the Center for Advanced Materials Processing (CAMP). CAMP is dedicated to developing Clarkson's research and educational programs in high-technology materials processing. It focuses on developing innovations in advanced materials processing and transferring this technology to business and industry. The center receives support from the New York State Office of Science, Technology, and Academic Research for research and operating expenses as one of 14 Centers for Advanced Technology (CATs). In addition, CAMP-related work receives several million dollars each year from the federal government and private industry.

Clarkson's 15 Student Projects for Engineering Experience and Design (SPEED) teams allow students across all majors to participate in hands-on, extracurricular projects.

Clarkson participates in student exchange programs with many schools in Europe and Australia. One example is the University of Leicester in the United Kingdom, where students who are studying engineering come to Clarkson for a year as part of one of the exchange programs.

Rankings

Clarkson University's Entrepreneurship Program is one of the top 15 in the nation, according to the Princeton Review's 2015 rankings. and Entrepreneur magazine's 2015 rankings. Clarkson University ranked #8 among "Top Salary-Boosting Colleges" nationwide in Moneys 2015 rankings.

U.S. News & World Report's 2019 rankings "America's Best Colleges" placed Clarkson University in the top 125 institutions in the nation, and a listing on the "Great Schools, Great Prices" list. Clarkson's supply chain management program was listed as one of the top 20 in the nation. The survey editors also placed Clarkson in the "A+ Options for B Students" list and on the "Best Colleges for Veterans" list in the National University category.

Clarkson University graduates have some of the highest salaries in the nation, according to the 2019 College Salary Report from PayScale Inc.

Clarkson's online graduate business programs #12 in the nation (U.S. News & World Report 2013).

Clarkson is #20 on the Fifty Most Affordable with a Return on Investment list, Bloomberg Businessweek, 2011.

Clarkson is ranked among the nation's most environmentally responsible colleges, by Princeton Review Guide to Green Colleges: 2019 edition.

U.S. News & World Report's Best Graduate Schools 2019 ranks Clarkson 40th overall in Environmental Engineering.

The Clarkson School
The Clarkson School, a special division of Clarkson University, was founded in 1978. The School offers students an early entrance opportunity into college, replacing the typical senior year of high school with a year of college. It is one of few college early admission programs in the country that provides a real community living/learning experience on a university campus.

The Clarkson School's Bridging Year is a "bridging year" between high school and college for students who are ready to enter college early. Every year 50 to 80 high school students are accepted to The Clarkson School, where they may work towards a GED and take college classes. They may also work with their high schools to complete a high school diploma or drop out of high school entirely. After they complete the program, they are given the option to enter Clarkson University with all credits from the previous year or to transfer to another school, usually as freshmen with advanced standing.

Students in The Clarkson School are fully matriculated undergraduates with freshman status at the university. They take classes with other University students and usually carry a course load of 15 to 18 credits per semester for two semesters. College credits may also be given for college and Advanced Placement courses taken before entering The Clarkson School. Cross-registration at neighboring area colleges and universities can provide additional college credits, particularly in art, music and languages. These credits also appear on an official Clarkson University transcript.

The Clarkson School students are housed in Newell House and Ormsby House in Price Hall and the typical class size is about 50 students. Students participating in this program are often called "Schoolies" by other Clarkson students.

Campus
Clarkson has two campuses in Potsdam—the "downtown" campus and the Collins Hill Campus—as well as the Capital Region Campus in Schenectady, New York, and the Beacon Institute for Rivers and Estuaries in Beacon, New York.

During the last 35 years, Clarkson has developed the Collins Hill Campus significantly. The health science departments of Occupational Therapy, Physical Therapy and Physician Assistant Studies are located on the downtown campus. The campus bookstore is located in downtown Potsdam. The last student dormitory (Congdon) located on the downtown campus closed in May 2006. The only buildings remaining in Clarkson's service at the downtown campus are a few administration buildings, the Army ROTC house, the Clarkson Hall Center for Health Sciences (physical therapy and physician assistant studies), and the Peyton Hall Business Incubator. Other downtown campus buildings contain leased space to businesses.

Academic buildings

 Bertrand H. Snell Hall ("New Snell") - Contains classrooms and home to the School of Business and the School of Arts and Sciences, along with the offices of the Department of Humanities and Social Sciences, and the Communication and Media Department.  Opened in 2001, Snell also contains Clarkson's Writing Center and the Eastman Kodak Center for Excellence in Communication.
 Cora and Bayard Clarkson Science Center - Contains classrooms, student and research labs. Home of Computer Science, Mathematics, Physics, Chemistry and Biology Departments. On the first and second floors towards Snell is the Biotechnology Wing, opened in Fall 2005. The Science Center is connected to Snell Hall by the Petersen Passageway on the third floor.Technology Advancement Center ("the TAC") - Contains two conference rooms/classrooms and three study areas on the second floor.  The first floor is home to the Division of Research, laboratories and graduate student offices.  The building also connects the Science Center and the ERC.
 Center for Advanced Materials Processing (CAMP) - Contains classrooms, student and research labs, and a machine shop. Home of Wallace H. Coulter School of Engineering.
 Rowley Labs - Connected to CAMP. Contains few classrooms and student labs. This building is used mainly for research.
 Educational Resources Center (ERC) - Contains Clarkson's library, Career Center, a common area for individual and group studying, residential housing administration, dean of students, Campus Safety & Security, Student Support Services, and Student Health Center. Also contains a few classrooms.

Residential buildings
 Townhouse Apartments - Each Townhouse is a four-person apartment with two double rooms and a bathroom upstairs. A kitchen and living room on the first floor. The Townhouses are generally used for senior and junior housing.
 Riverside Apartments - Each Riverside apartment contains a first floor with kitchen and living room. The upstairs varies and will house four people. Two singles and a double bedroom or two doubles. The Riverside apartments are generally used by juniors and seniors.
 Woodstock Village - Woodstock apartments are for three to seven people with many different configurations. A four-person style has a living room, kitchen and four private bedrooms. Woodstock Village is used by seniors and a few juniors. In Summer 2011, a renovation of all 10 WSV buildings began. As of Summer 2014, the final building has been renovated. The buildings were renovated in an "Adirondack Style" and enjoy many upgrades to bring them into the 21st century.

 Price and Graham Hall - Still known as "The New Dorms" although built in the 1960s, they consist of the Price and Graham complexes, each split into four Houses. The Graham Hall complex consists of Donahue, Olson, Van Note, and Wilson Houses, while the Price Hall complex consists of Farrisee, Newell, Ormsby, and Thomas Houses. Newell House and Ormsby House are reserved for the Clarkson School and the Honors Program. There are a few styles of rooms. Most are four-person suites containing 2 double bedrooms linked by a common bathroom. The other four-person suites are composed of a single double bedroom and two single bedrooms which share a single bathroom. There are a handful of single double bedrooms, which have their own bathroom. These few double bedrooms are much larger than any other suite. The center core of both complexes formerly housed cafeterias. The center core of Graham Hall is now the Service Center, Student Administrative Services, Payroll and other administrative departments. The center core of Price Hall is now the Clarkson School/Honors offices and the Air Force ROTC. These two complexes were planned to be the on-campus Greek housing, but admission growth pressures caused them to be used as ordinary dormitories. Each house was to be a separate fraternity or sorority.
 Moore House - Generally inhabited by juniors and sophomores, it is the closest residential building to Snell Hall and the Science Center. Moore is divided into two wings and a center core. The first three floors of each wing contain two doubles with a common bathroom.  All four floors in the center core contain doubles with private bathrooms, and the fourth floor of each wing contains a five-person, a six-person, and an eight-person suite. Moore House underwent a full renovation, including the addition of the fourth floor from 2011 to 2012.
 The Quad - Used for freshman housing. The Quad is composed of four buildings- Ross, Brooks, Cubley, and Reynolds Houses – linked by the Ross-Brooks Marketplace, between Ross House and Brooks house. The laundry facility as well as the RA office are located between the four houses in the center core of the Quad. It is possible to move between Ross and Brooks without going outside.  The Quad buildings had a fourth floor addition during the summer of 2009. The center core of the quad, on the Cubley-Reynolds side houses Quad 200 which is used for First-Year Seminar classes. This new classroom is in the former Empire Diner location.
 Hamlin-Powers ("The Pit") - Hamlin Powers houses all levels of students. The buildings were renovated in 2003, and a fourth floor was added in 2010. The fourth floors consist of single-rooms which have great appeal to students who prefer private living quarters. Rooms in the first, second, and third floors of the buildings are double occupancy.

Other buildingsThe Student Center  is a student centered building constructed between the Educational Resources Center and CAMP.  The official groundbreaking was held on May 9, 2009, but construction did not begin until June 8, 2009.  Its official opening was on August 27, 2010.  Eateries include the Student Center Servery and Natural!.  Other amenities include Bar 9, C-Store, student mailroom, radio station (WTSC 91.1FM), TV station WCKN, and newspaper (The Integrator) office on the lower level; the Clarkson University Student Association (CUSA) offices on the main floor; and large amounts of lounge space on all three levels.  The core of the building is home to a large presentation area known as the Forum, used for presentations and activities.
 Cheel Campus Center - Contains eating facilities in Main Street Cafe, including a Subway, Smokehouse and the Main Street Grill, Club 99 (on campus bar), and, of course, Cheel Arena (home of Clarkson's hockey teams).
 Denny Brown Adirondack Lodge - A cabin of sorts, built behind the townhouses and tucked into the woods on the edge of campus. This building is used by all the outdoor clubs including the Outing Club, Ski Club, Cycling Club and Nordic Ski Team. Gear lockers are located in the basement while the first floor is used as a meeting place for clubs and organizations. The upstairs floor is reserved living quarters for the head of Outdoor Recreation.
 Schuler Indoor Recreation Center (IRC) - Contains the Stephenson Field House with basketball courts and an indoor track, Fuller Pool, racquetball courts, exercise equipment, and the parquet-floored Alumni Gymnasium with bleachers.  The Alumni Gymnasium is home to Clarkson's basketball and volleyball teams, and Fuller Pool is home to Clarkson's swim teams.
 Fuller Pool - The Fuller Pool is located inside of the IRC and is a 25-meter, 8-lane pool. In the far end of the pool, there is a one-meter and three-meter diving board. The starting blocks are located in the shallow end of the pool with a balcony directly behind and above the starting blocks. The balcony is accessible via the Field House. 
 Boat House - Located behind the Riverside Apartments on the Raquette River. This building contains canoes and kayaks owned and maintained by the Outing Club.

Dining facilities
 The Student Center Servery - Located on the upper floor of the Student Center. There are various options and stations in this location.
 Taco Station
 Grill Station
Noon-n-Night Station - serving salads during the day and pasta at night
 Pasta Station
 International Station
 Ross-Brooks Marketplace ("Ro-Bro") - Located in the Quad, Ro-Bro is an all-you-care-to-eat dining hall facility open seven days a week. For breakfast, lunch and dinner. Also offers late-night selections.
 Main Street Café - Located inside of the Cheel Campus Center, the Main Street Café contains: Subway, Smoke House, and Main Street Grill.
  Bar 9 - Located in Student Center in Brilbeck's Tavern with foosball, pool and dartboard. No food is served here, but beer is available during open hours for those of age.
 Java City - Located in the Student Center, Java City sells coffee, specialty beverages and pre-made sandwiches.
 Concrete Café - Located on the third floor of the Science Center, the Concrete Café sells coffee, soup, salads, and sandwiches.
 The Healthy Pantry - Located in Hamilin-Powers, sells breakfast and lunch items similar to the Concrete 
 Mo-joe - Located on the ground floor of Snell, student run business sells coffee, espresso beverages, and lunch items from popular downtown eateries

Student activities

Athletics

Clarkson's athletic teams are known collectively as the Golden Knights. There are 20 varsity athletic teams. Except for the men's and women's alpine and nordic skiing, all of these teams compete in the NCAA.

While Clarkson is an NCAA Division III school, both the men's and women's ice hockey teams compete in Division I, with both teams playing in the ECAC. The men's team is a traditional power in the ECAC. They have won 6 ECAC Tournament Championships, most recently in 2019. Clarkson's most recent NCAA tournament was as the number two seed in the 2019 NCAA Northeast Regional, where they lost in overtime to the University of Notre Dame, 3–2, in the 1st round.

The women's team is far younger, beginning play in 2003, than the men's team, although they too have become an ECAC power. The team has appeared in every tournament since entering the ECAC in 2004 and have appeared in four NCAA tournaments, winning the 2018 edition, 2017 edition and 2014 edition, the first three NCAA titles won by the school, the first NCAA ice hockey title won by a school in St. Lawrence County, and the first Division I NCAA championship won by a school from the North Country.

Other Division III varsity teams compete in the Liberty League conference and include baseball, men's and women's basketball, men's and women's cross country, men's golf, men's and women's lacrosse, men's and women's soccer, softball, men's and women's swimming, and women's volleyball.

The men and women's alpine skiing and nordic skiing teams compete in the MacConnell Division of the Eastern Collegiate Ski Conference (ECSC), within the United States Collegiate Ski and Snowboard Association (USCSA). They are top contenders almost every year within their division and even conference, and have consistently qualified for the annual USCSA National Championships numerous times. In 2019, the Women's Nordic Team were USCSA National Champions and the Men placed second.

Other non-varsity clubs include men's and women's ice hockey, men's lacrosse, men's and women's rugby union, men's soccer, men's bowling, combined men's and women's crew, and ultimate frisbee. Clarkson's combined men's and women's club racquetball team won the Division II title at the USRA National Tournament in 2005. In 2010, the school started a club football team.

"The Golden Knight" is the university's hockey mascot, which can be seen at hockey games waving the Clarkson flag.  The nickname "Golden Knights" was first suggested in an editorial of the October 28, 1950 issue of the Clarkson Integrator, and was in use by the following month.

Clubs
Clarkson University's Student Association (CUSA) sponsors more than 130 clubs and organizations, the largest of which being the Outing Club, Ski Club, Cornhole Club, the Clarkson Pep Band, and the Clarkson Union Board. All CUSA sponsored clubs are entirely student-run and both undergraduate and graduate students are welcome to join.

Clarkson Mountain Bike Club
Non-stop shredding in the ECCC

Clarkson Union BoardClarkson Union Board (CUB) is the campus's programming board. CUB hosts various campus events throughout the semester and co-sponsors events with other organizations and University offices and departments. CUB provides professional quality audio and visual support for on-campus events, and hosts the annual SpringFest/FallFest concerts. Previous performers have included the Yung Gravy, bbno$, Panic! at the Disco, Jay Sean, and the All American Rejects.

K2CCAmateur Radio Club (K2CC), established in 1922 is the university's oldest organization that is still active today. The club offers two licensing exam sessions per semester and interacts regularly with the local community. K2CC has both analog and digital voice repeaters and maintains a contest and experimentation room equipped with DX, weak signal and satellite radios and antennas.

WTSC
With WTSC 91.1 FM The Source, Clarkson also offers one of the North Country's most popular radio stations, which is run completely by the student body.  Students can broadcast their own shows, and offers a wide variety of music from Rap to Alternative, from Classic rock to street punk. The station has well over 1000 CDs and nearly 24 Terabytes of music on vinyl.  The station has a fully equipped broadcast studio (studio A), as well as a second studio for mixing (studio B), and a fully functional recording studio.

Clarkson Photo Club
The Clarkson Photo Club is a group of students with strong interests in photography, ranging from black and white, color, or digital.

Golden Knotes
Clarkson Golden Knotes is the Co-ed a Cappella group on campus that formed in the Spring of 2002. Every semester a Final Performance is held to showcase the songs the group worked on for that semester. They also perform at various events on campus. Each year, executive board members of the Golden Knotes hire music students from the neighboring Crane School of Music to serve as music director of the group.

FIRST Robotics
Clarkson Robotics brings Clarkson University students together with local high school students to design, build, and test a robot that competes in the FIRST Robotics Competition each year.

Applied Computer Science Labs
Applied CS Labs - The Applied Computer Science Labs at Clarkson University consists of the Clarkson Open Source Institute, the Internet Teaching Lab, and the Virtual Reality Lab, however only the first is populated. These labs, better known as COSI, are almost entirely student-run, offering the opportunity to gain experience in managing both facilities and projects. All three labs are located on the 3rd floor of the Science Center in rooms SC334 and SC336.

Clarkson Pep Band

The Clarkson University Pep Band is a student-run organization that supports the Clarkson University Golden Knights ice hockey teams. The band consists of approximately 75 full-time members, and performs at Clarkson's Cheel Arena at all of the home games for the Men's NCAA Division I hockey team and some games for the NCAA Division I Women's team.

The band also travels to Clarkson Men's ECAC Hockey conference away games with 35-40 members (unless restricted by the policies of the opposing team's arena, notably at Saint Lawrence University) and post-season tournaments.

The Clarkson University Pep Band was founded in the fall of 1964, by a small group of Clarkson students. By the 1980s, the band's membership grew significantly.

Clarkson Theatre Company
The Clarkson Theatre Company (CTC) is a student-run theatre group, part of Clarkson University and supported by the Clarkson University Student Association (CUSA). The mission of CTC is to provide both theatrical entertainment and an outlet for artistic self-expression in the realm of the theatre arts at Clarkson.  Membership consists of students and faculty from Clarkson and the other Associated Colleges of the St. Lawrence Valley (SUNY Potsdam, SUNY Canton, and St. Lawrence University)

Every fall, CTC puts on a musical over Clarkson University's family weekend, sometime in mid-to-late October. The production time for this show is between 5 and 7 weeks. After the fall production is over, preparations for the One Act Festival begin. This festival is made up of short plays chosen and directed by students, as well as several written by students. This festival is usually put on as a fundraiser for a charity chosen by the executive board, and takes place at the end of January or beginning of February. The next show, usually a straight play, is put on near the beginning of April. Show choice for each slot is not limited to either a musical or play, but it is traditional to use this structure; as shows are chosen by a general member vote, however, any show can be chosen to be put on any semester.

CTC's most famous alumnus is not a student, but an adviser. Wes Craven, creator of the A Nightmare on Elm Street franchise, was a professor at Clarkson University in 1968, as well as faculty adviser to the Clarkson Drama Club (the predecessor of the current Clarkson Theatre Company). As part of one of Professor Craven's classes, Humanities IV, several Theta Chi members wanted to make a spoof of traditional horror movies, about the strange occurrences in their fraternity's house at 18 Elm Street. The filming included CTC's home, Old Snell Hall, where the boiler room scene took place in the basement. While none of those involved had very much film experience, they made the film for about $300 and it was shown twice on campus. Much of Craven's inspiration for A Nightmare on Elm Street came from this first filmmaking experience; the house in the movie, while not the house used in the first version, resembles this house and also resides on Elm Street.

Fraternities and sororities
Clarkson social fraternities began organizing on campus in 1903.  Several local organizations accepted members from both Clarkson and SUNY Potsdam.  In 1977, the first Clarkson-only sorority was founded, and in 1987 Clarkson discontinued recognition of the local sororities at SUNY Potsdam.  Clarkson women were still allowed to join these organizations but they could not participate in on-campus rush or live in their houses prior to other off-campus options. Over the years, there have been many different fraternities and sororities that have come and gone due to declining membership, university probationary periods, and disaffiliation from nationals. In order for the university to recognize a Greek organization, all the members must be registered Clarkson students. Additionally, any new organization applying for recognition after 1977 must affiliate with a national organization within five years to maintain recognition. Clarkson recognized international and national fraternities are Alpha Chi Rho, Delta Upsilon, Phi Kappa Sigma, Sigma Chi, Sigma Phi Epsilon, Tau Epsilon Phi and Tau Kappa Epsilon; there remains only one recognized local fraternity, Zeta Nu. Clarkson recognized international and national sororities are Delta Zeta, Phi Sigma Sigma, Theta Phi Alpha, and Kappa Delta Chi.  Additionally, there are a number of professional Greek lettered organizations: Alpha Kappa Psi, Chi Epsilon, Omega Chi Epsilon, Phi Delta Epsilon, Phi Kappa Phi, Tau Beta Pi, and Tri-Beta. Clarkson is also home to a chapter of the national service fraternity Alpha Phi Omega.Interfraternity CouncilThe Interfraternity Council (IFC) provides outlets for social interaction among the fraternity and sorority members. IFC helps to sponsor educational opportunities for all of its members and to help to promote the fraternal ideals of leadership, scholarship, service, community and brotherhood.Panhellenic CouncilThe Panhellenic Council is the governing body of the sorority system. The Panhellenic Council provides many opportunities for involvement in campus life and the fraternity and sorority system outside of the individual sororities. Recruitment, social, and educational opportunities are provided by the council. All social sororities recognized by Clarkson University adhere to the rules and regulations set by the National Panhellenic Conference.Greek Life'''

A few organizations have chapter houses off campus; others have plans of having chapter houses on campus in the near future.  Clarkson fraternities and sororities take great pride in their chapter houses because of the rich history each residence has.

The Greek community is very tight knit because of the university's small size.  Fraternities and sororities attend each other's national philanthropy and local community service events.  Greek Week and Ice Carnival have an extensive history both with the local colleges and the Potsdam community.

Publications and media
 The Integrator is a weekly student-run newspaper which is distributed on Clarkson's campus as well as the town of Potsdam.
 WCKN Television is a student-run television station and is also the local cable systems public access station. In-house programming includes hockey games, news, talk shows, comedy shows, game shows, and various other Clarkson sporting events.
 WTSC Clarkson Radio is a student-run radio station that gives students the opportunity to produce their own weekly radio programs, and consequently serve the community by offering entertainment, news and weather, and special programming via the radio.
 The Clarksonian is a student-run yearbook publication group.

ROTC
Clarkson University is a host university for both the Army ROTC and Air Force ROTC. ROTC has been an institution at Clarkson since May 1936, when the first ROTC Battalion was activated during the tenure of College President James S. Thomas. The ROTC program at Clarkson has commissioned well over 1,150 military officers. These alumni have been represented at each level of the Officer Corps, from Second Lieutenant to General.

Army ROTC
The Clarkson Army ROTC Battalion (officially the "Golden Knight Battalion") is one of 272 Army ROTC battalions in the United States. The average size of the Golden Knight Battalion is 100 Cadets, mostly Clarkson students. The headquarters for the Golden Knight Battalion was at 49 Elm St. on Clarkson's downtown campus, where it has been located for decades. It is now in the Old Main Building on Main Street, Potsdam.

Notable alumni
Business
Barney Adams (founder of Adams Golf)
Harvey Glatt (founder of CHEZ-FM radio and notable Canadian music impresario)
Arnold Gosewich (Canadian record industry executive and literary agent)
Rene Haas (tech industry executive, CEO of Arm Ltd.
Paul Horn (senior vice president, R&D, IBM)
Roger Johnson (Businessman and government official)
Ilmārs Rimšēvičs (Governor of the Central Bank of Latvia)
Martin Roesch (author of Snort and founder of Sourcefire)
Brenda Romero (game industry pioneer and game designer)
Mike Smith (NHL hockey executive)

Education
Gregory C. Farrington (former president of Lehigh University, executive director of The California Academy of Sciences)
Sanjeev Kulkarni (professor and university administrator)

Entertainment
Albert Bouchard (co-founder of the Blue Öyster Cult)
Kaitlin Monte (Clarkson School 2006, Miss New York 2011, Miss America 2012 Second Runner -up, TV news anchor)
Donald Roeser (co-founder of the Blue Öyster Cult)
M. Emmet Walsh (actor)

Sport
Mark Borowiecki (hockey player)
Chris Clark (hockey player)
Grant Clitsome (hockey player, Columbus Blue Jackets)
Erik Cole (hockey player, Olympian, Stanley Cup champion)
Craig Conroy (hockey player, Olympian)
Steve Dubinsky (hockey player)
Renata Fast (hockey player, Olympian)
Loren Gabel (hockey player, Patty Kazmaier Award winner)
Kent Huskins (hockey player, Stanley Cup champion)
Randy Jones (hockey player)
Jarmo Kekalainen (hockey player, NHL executive)
Craig Laughlin (hockey player, television color analyst for Washington Capitals games)
Todd Marchant (hockey player, Olympian, Stanley Cup champion)
Willie Mitchell (hockey player, Stanley Cup champion)
Colin Patterson (hockey player, Stanley Cup champion)
Jack Phillips (Major League Baseball player, and a long-time Golden Knights coach)
Jamie Lee Rattray (hockey player, Olympian, Patty Kazmaier Award winner)
Nico Sturm (hockey player, Stanley Cup champion)
Dave Taylor (hockey player, NHL hockey executive)
Todd White hockey player

Government
Francis K. Brooks (majority leader of the Vermont House of Representatives and member of the Vermont Senate)
Bob Chiarelli (former mayor, Ottawa, Ontario, Canada)
Lisa Hershman (American government official who served as the chief management officer of the Department of Defense)
Katherina Reiche (German politician)
Dede Scozzafava (former congressional candidate and former New York State Assemblywoman)
Dan Stec (New York State Senator-45th Senate District)
Paul Tonko (Congressman for New York's 21st congressional district)

Science
George C. Schatz (theoretical chemist and nanotech researcher at Northwestern University)
Thomas Zacharia (laboratory director, Oak Ridge National Laboratory)
Michael Sarafin (Mission Manager, Aretis, NASA; Flight Director Orion, ISS and Space Shuttle, NASA)
Timothy Canham (software engineer at NASA; software and operations lead for Ingenuity'')

Technology
Patrick Naughton (co-creator of the Java programming language)
Russ Nelson (Open Source Initiative board member)

See also
 Association of Independent Technological Universities

Notes

References

External links
 
 Clarkson Athletics website

 
Private universities and colleges in New York (state)
Educational institutions established in 1896
Universities and colleges in St. Lawrence County, New York
1896 establishments in New York (state)
Technological universities in the United States
Engineering universities and colleges in New York (state)